Vigyan Ashram is a learning center for contemplation and study of ancient Indian philosophy belonging to the Indian Institute of Education (IIE) Pune, established by Dr. S. S. Kalbag in 1983. It's a modern version of the old Gurukula system of 'simple living and high thinking'. Vigyan Ashram is located in the village Pabal, approx.  from Pune. It is situated on Shirur Road, Rajgurunagar. Population of Pabal is around 10,000. There are several small hamlets attached to Pabal, which make Pabal the central market place for the region. Pabal is drought-prone and truly representative of a template Indian village. The idea of establishing Vigyan Ashram at Pabal was to design a blueprint template of the highest principles presented systematically and logically to modern intellects so that everyone can be equipped with knowledge of life and living. Literally meaning that whatever the participants practice and do at the Ashram can be replicated in any part of the country.

In English “Vigyan” means ‘Search of Truth’ and “Ashram” symbolizes ‘Simple living and high thinking for us, an organization where all are equal, a modern version of the old Gurukul system’.

Technology Development and Education 
Fab Lab

Vigyan Ashram runs a fabrication labrotory to teach use of various tools, machines and produces locally made technological gadgets.

DBRT (Diploma in Basic Rural Technology)
DBRT is a one-year residential diploma course offered at Vigyan Ashram. This course is recognized by the National Institute of Open Schooling and useful for students interested to learn by hand. It is a multi-skill program in which training is given in the areas of:
Engineering - fabrication & construction, basic carpentry, engineering drawing & costing.
Energy & Environment - electrical, Motor rewinding, survey techniques, solar/biogas, etc.
Home and Health - sewing, food processing, and rural lab.
Agriculture and Animal Husbandry playhouse, poultry, goat farming, dairy nursery techniques.

External Support 
Many Government, private organizations and individual donors support the program. Trustees of the Indian Institute of Education manage Vigyan Ashram.

Gallery

See also
Shri Bhairavnath Vidya Mandir, Pabal

References

External links
 
Learning While Doing
Information on Dr. S.S. Kalbag on Indiatogether.org

Education in Pune district
Hackerspaces